Tom Stanton (born 21 September 1997) is an Irish cricketer. He made his Twenty20 cricket debut for Leinster Lightning in the 2017 Inter-Provincial Trophy on 9 June 2017. Prior to his T20 debut, he was part of Ireland's squad for the 2016 Under-19 Cricket World Cup.

References

External links
 

1997 births
Living people
Irish cricketers
Leinster Lightning cricketers
Place of birth missing (living people)